The fat-tailed dwarf lemur (Cheirogaleus medius), also known as the lesser dwarf lemur, western fat-tailed dwarf lemur, or spiny forest dwarf lemur, is endemic to Madagascar.

Hibernation
Recent research has shown that C. medius hibernates (or aestivates), even though in the tropical winter of Madagascar, temperatures remain high. It is the first tropical mammal and only primate in which hibernation has been demonstrated. However, the Malagasy winter is dry, and it appears that the lemur is avoiding the drought. It can hibernate for seven months. Unlike animals that hibernate in temperate regions, the lemur does not control its body temperature while hibernating, and if the tree hole in which it is sleeping is not well insulated, its body temperature fluctuates in accordance with the outside temperature. During torpor, this lemur has been found to periodically enter REM sleep; non-REM sleep has not been observed, a pattern opposite that found in hibernating ground squirrels. The REM sleep episodes occurred during periods of higher ambient temperature (averaging 27 C, versus an average of 20 C during nonsleeping intervals while in torpor).

C. medius has a significantly longer lifespan than other strepsirrhinine or nonstrepsirrhinine primates of similar size, and this longevity is thought to be related to its status as the only primate that is an obligatory hibernator. Its maximum lifespan in captivity is nearly 30 years.

Like other fat-tailed lemurs, C. medius is able to store fat in its tail, and this provides a source of energy during its period of dormancy.

Reproduction 
Although most C. medius live in areas where the environment is dry, there are those who live in tropical rain forest. Through research, it is understood that these animals hibernation period is linked to their reproduction strategies. In the rainforest these lemurs are in more in an active state than they would be in a dry forest. This level of high activity from the lemurs is linked to higher reproduction rates according to Dr. Lahann.

Taxonomy

Between 2000 and 2009, a population of dwarf lemur was known as a separate species, the southern fat-tailed dwarf lemur (Cheirogaleus adipicaudatus).  It was described by taxonomist Colin Groves as having a pelage coloration that is dark dorsally and gray ventrally, with a vaguely expressed dorsal stripe running down the back, a relatively short white median facial stripe, and black eye-rings.  However, in 2009, Groeneveld et al. demonstrated genetically that Cheirogaleus adipicaudatus was a synonym of Cheirogaleus medius, so the southern fat-tailed dwarf lemur is no longer recognized as a species.

Traits
This species is nocturnal, with a diet of insects, other small animals, fruits and flowers. The adult lemur mass is 160 grams.

References

Further reading
 
 

Dwarf lemurs
Mammals described in 1812
Taxa named by Étienne Geoffroy Saint-Hilaire